Stanisławów  is a village in the administrative district of Gmina Policzna, within Zwoleń County, Masovian Voivodeship, in east-central Poland.

References

Villages in Zwoleń County